The NER class Z (LNER Class C7) was an Atlantic class of locomotives designed by Vincent Raven. It was introduced in 1911.

Construction and early life
Vincent Raven had been appointed Chief Mechanical Engineer of the North Eastern Railway (NER) in June 1910. His predecessor, Wilson Worsdell, had introduced three-cylinder simple-expansion locomotives to the NER with the Class X 4-8-0T, ten of which were built in 1909–10 for heavy shunting. One of Raven's first designs was another three-cylinder locomotive, the Class Y 4-6-2T, twenty of which were built in 1910–11 for hauling coal trains from collieries to ports. The success of these two designs convinced Raven to design a three-cylinder locomotive to haul express passenger trains. Worsdell's two-cylinder Class V 4-4-2 were handling the principal East Coast expresses, and Raven combined the 4-4-2 wheel arrangement with three cylinders to produce his new design. The three cylinders measured  bore by  stroke driving the leading coupled axle, fed by piston valves which were themselves operated by Stephenson's link motion. The cylinders and their valve chests were made as a single casting.
Originally classified NER Class V2, the first 20 were built in 1911 by the North British Locomotive Company. This was the first time since the 1880s that the NER had used a private contractor, and was necessary because Gateshead works had stopped building new locomotives in 1910 and Darlington Works was fully booked. Ten of these locomotives were saturated and the others were superheated. The classification V2 was soon amended, with the saturated locomotives becoming Class Z, and the superheated locomotives Z1. A further thirty of Class Z1 were built at Darlington Works in 1914–18, and in June 1914, Class Z1 was redesignated Class Z.

At the end of 1920, the fifty locomotives were based at principal main-line depots: there were 21 at Gateshead, fourteen at York, seven at Tweedmouth, five at Heaton, and three at Leeds (Neville Hill). By the 1923 Grouping, four were at Haymarket (Edinburgh). At these depots they shared duties with the other NER Atlantics, classes V and 4CC: these included the principal expresses on the East Coast Main Line: York–Newcastle and Newcastle–Edinburgh, together with the through services from Liverpool (Lime Street) to Newcastle, which were hauled by a locomotive of the London and North Western Railway between Leeds and Liverpool.

All fifty passed to the London and North Eastern Railway (LNER) at the 1923 Grouping, they retained their NER numbers but were now known as LNER Class C7. To begin with, they continued on the same duties, but in 1924–25, the LNER took delivery of forty Class A1 4-6-2, of which ten were allocated to Gateshead and five each to Haymarket and Heaton. At these depots they took over some of the duties previously handled by the ex-NER Atlantics, for which other duties were found, resulting in a certain amount of reallocation: in December 1929, there were nineteen C7s at York, sixteen at Gateshead, seven at Heaton, five at Tweedmouth and three at Haymarket. More 4-6-2s (of classes A3 and A4) were built between 1930 and 1938 bringing about further changes in allocation – the September 1939 allocation of Class C7 was 26 at York, ten at Gateshead, four at Heaton, three each at Neville Hill and Tweedmouth, and one each at Haymarket and St Margaret's (Edinburgh); the two C9s were at Tweedmouth.

Variations
From the very start the class was used for comparative trials and experiments.

Superheaters
When the first twenty locomotives were ordered, the benefits of superheated steam were still being evaluated. Accordingly, the new class was used for a direct comparison – ten worked with saturated steam, whilst the boilers of the remaining ten were equipped with Schmidt superheaters. It did not take long for the advantages of superheating to become apparent, including a saving in fuel. Therefore, when further locomotives were ordered, they also had Schmidt superheaters; duting 1914–15, the first ten were converted similarly. However, the cylinder bore and boiler pressure of the superheated locomotives were altered to match those of the first ten. As the original boilers wore out, replacements were constructed; those made from 1931 used Robinson superheaters instead of Schmidt ones.

Uniflow cylinders
The last of the 50 locos, No. 2212 was built with Stumpf Uniflow cylinders. This arrangement had been used on LNER Class B15 No. 825 with an untidy result, however the arrangement had been tidied up for No. 2212. Double-length cylinders were required, thus a longer front bogie and smaller wheels were fitted. This arrangement, although requiring special attention (as with No. 825)  was used until 1934, when No. 2212 was fitted with normal cylinders and Lentz rotary cam poppet valves.

Feedwater heaters
Normally, a locomotive boiler is fed with cold water from the tender or tank and must be heated from ambient temperature to its boiling point in order to make steam. When the steam has been used in the cylinders, it is exhausted through the chimney, and the heat that it contains is lost. Some engineers had tried different systems for extracting heat from the exhaust steam in order to pre-heat the boiler feedwater, and so use less fuel in the firebox.

The Dabeg feedwater heater was tried out by the LNER on two locomotives in the 1920s, and C7 no. 2163 was one of those selected for fitment (the other being Class O2 no. 3500). A heat exchanger was mounted on the left-hand side of the locomotive above the footplate, through which exhaust steam was passed. A pump driven from the rear coupled wheel pumped cold water from the tender through the heat exchanger and a grease separator before being forced into the boiler. The equipment was fitted to no. 2163 in 1928 and removed in 1937.

The A.C.F.I. system was French, and the LNER made more extensive use of it – several Class B12 locomotives were given this equipment, as were two Class C7, nos. 728 and 2206. The equipment was fitted to these in 1928, and although the trial officially ended in 1937, the equipment was not removed from the two Class C7 until 1941–42.

Boosters
In early 1931, Gresley rebuilt Nos. 727 and 2171 (which were entering Darlington for repairs) with an articulated booster bogie, thus making them technically 4-4-4-4s. However the articulated bogie was considered split between the loco and tender in order to simplify classification. Originally the booster gearing was 1.5:1, however the trials of C1 No. 4419 (also having boosters) showed that the booster help was practically nonexistent above , meaning that the locomotives' boosters were practically useless with the express, which would have to run with a speed of at least . Hence, Darlington recommended that the booster gearing was to be changed to 1:1. This required larger cylinders to supply the same tractive effort, which required the boiler to operate at 200psi (25 psi higher than the C7s, which are 175psi) . Some have concerned about engaging the booster at higher speeds, however the unitary 1:1 gearing was considered to make this easier. The boilers were "Diagram 100" boilers (the ones used on the B17s), and followed Doncaster practices, rather than Darlington practices (which was used on the standard C7s). They also have Robinson superheaters, rather than Schmidt ones.

The growing amount of Gresley A1s, A3s and A4s marked the experiment redundant (seeing the A4s were scheduled to climb Cockburnspath hauling a 312 tons load at an average speed of ).

Lentz valves
In 1933, Gresley rebuilt no. 732 with new cylinders of the same type as used on Class D49/2. These measured  and had poppet valves actuated by Lentz rotary cam valve gear, which provided five different cut-off settings for forward running, and two for reverse. The modifications required a new crank axle and new bogie having smaller wheels, which was mounted further forwards. This locomotive also had other modifications, and was designated Class C7/2, the unmodified locomotives being reclassified C7/1. In 1934, no. 2212 (the former Uniflow locomotive) was similarly modified, except that the valve gear allowed seven different settings for forward running, and two for reverse. However, rebuilding took some time, and No. 2212 did not return to service until January 1936.

Withdrawal

Withdrawal of the C7
By the late 1930s, the new V2s were taking away the duties of the C7s. Had World War 2 not intervened, withdrawal would have started before 1940. However withdrawal was pushed back to August 1943. Withdrawal was quick, however, with only 14 surviving to nationalization. Within a year, British Railways withdrew the remaining C7s, with none surviving into preservation.

Withdrawal of the C9
Their boilers were considered non-standard (compared to the C7s), thus they were withdrawn in April 1942(2171) and January 1943(727), before the first standard C7 was withdrawn. Neither of the two survived into preservation.

Loco details

Numbers in parentheses were allocated but not applied.

See also
NER Class 4.6.2, which was based on the C7s
NER Class R1, which the C7s were initially based on
NER Class V and V/09, which the C7s were similar to

References

Further reading

External links
LNER Class C7/NER Class Z
LNER Class C9

Z class
4-4-2 locomotives
Scrapped locomotives
Standard gauge steam locomotives of Great Britain
Passenger locomotives
Railway locomotives introduced in 1911